Gaya Prasad was the Chaube of Taraon State from 1812 to 1840.

References

History of India